Cyperus karisimbiensis is a species of sedge that is native to tropical parts of Africa.

See also 
 List of Cyperus species

References 

karisimbiensis
Plants described in 1936
Flora of Kenya
Flora of Rwanda
Flora of Tanzania
Flora of Uganda
Flora of the Democratic Republic of the Congo
Taxa named by Georg Kükenthal